Ibsen Pinheiro (5 July 1935 – 24 January 2020) was a Brazilian journalist politician who served as a Deputy and as President of the Chamber of Deputies. He was president of the chamber during the impeachment of Fernando Collor de Mello.

Early life
Pinheiro was the son of Ricardo Pinheiro Bermudes and Lilia Valls Pinheiro. He graduated with a degree in law from the Pontifical Catholic University of Rio Grande do Sul in the 1960s.

References

1935 births
2020 deaths
Pontifical Catholic University of Rio Grande do Sul alumni
Brazilian journalists
Brazilian Democratic Movement politicians
Presidents of the Chamber of Deputies (Brazil)
Members of the Chamber of Deputies (Brazil) from Rio Grande do Sul
Members of the Legislative Assembly of Rio Grande do Sul